is a Japanese manga series written and illustrated by Onigunsou. It was first serialized in Shueisha's seinen manga magazine Miracle Jump from April 2014 to December 2015 and it was later transferred to Ultra Jump in January 2016. An anime television series adaptation by Bandai Namco Pictures premiered in January 2023.

Characters

The heir to the Kunato house of Saenome based in Tokyo. A pessimistic young man whose siblings were murdered by a tsukumogami, his attitude out in the field has resulted his grandfather sending him to live with the residents of the Nagatsuki house, in the hopes that he will learn to "love" tsukumogami again. 

A young college student who lives with several benevolent tsukumogami in the Nagatsuki house. She is possessed by a marebito that is the target of most if not all Saenome factions, making her a highly valuable figure in the community. As such, she is protected by a neutrality law that prevents others from attacking her. 

One of the several benevolent tsukumogami living in the Nagatsuki house.

One of the several benevolent tsukumogami living in the Nagatsuki house.

One of the several benevolent tsukumogami living in the Nagatsuki house.

One of the six benevolent tsukumogami living in the Nagatsuki house.

One of the several benevolent tsukumogami living in the Nagatsuki mansion. She serves as Zohei's primary contact for Hyoma's stay at Nagatsuki house. 

Taiju's only daughter. For unknown reasons, she is searching for the same tsukumogami that killed Hyoma's siblings. 

The head of Kadomori House based in Kyoto. Although he offers Hyoma a chance to cooperate with him, his refusal to eliminate Botan and her tsukumogami results in him becoming his enemy. After witnessing Hyoma's abilities up close, he decides to proceed with his allowance for Hyoma to operate in Kyoto. 

Taiju's eldest son. 

Taiju's second son.

Media

Manga
Written and illustrated by Onigunsou, Malevolent Spirits: Mononogatari was first serialized in Shueisha's seinen manga magazine Miracle Jump from April 15, 2014, until the magazine's last issue, released on December 15, 2015. The series was transferred to Ultra Jump on January 19, 2016. Shueisha has collected its chapters into individual tankōbon volumes. The first volume was released on March 19, 2015. As of January 19, 2023, fifteen volumes have been released.

The manga is licensed in North America by Seven Seas Entertainment.

Volume list

Anime
In November 2021, it was announced that the series will receive an anime television series adaptation. It is produced by Bandai Namco Pictures and directed by Ryuichi Kimura, with scripts written by Keiichirō Ōchi, character designs handled by Shiori Fujisawa, and music composed by John Kanda and XELIK. The series premiered on January 10, 2023, on Tokyo MX and other networks. Arcana Project performed the opening theme song , while True performed the ending theme song "Rebind". Crunchyroll has licensed the series.

Episode list

Notes

References

External links
  
  
 

2023 anime television series debuts
Action anime and manga
Anime series based on manga
Bandai Namco Pictures
Crunchyroll anime
Seinen manga
Seven Seas Entertainment titles
Shueisha manga
Supernatural anime and manga
Tokyo MX original programming